Dato' Haji Mohd Suhaimi bin Abdullah is a Malaysian politician. He has served as the Member of Parliament (MP) for Langkawi since 2022. He was also a member of Dewan Negara from May 2014 to August 2020 representing Kedah.

Political career
Mohd Suhaimi was elected to the Dewan Negara by the Kedah State Legislative Assembly in May 2014. He was re-elected for a second term in August 2017.

At the 2022 election, Mohd Suhaimi was elected to Parliamentary in a five-cornered fight representing Langkawi. He succeeded former Prime Minister Mahathir Mohamad who previously held that seat.

Election results

Honours
  :
  Knight Companion of the Order of Loyalty to Negeri Sembilan (DSNS) – Dato' (1998)

Footnotes

References

Date of birth missing (living people)
Living people
Malaysian Muslims
Malaysian people of Malay descent
Malaysian United Indigenous Party politicians
Former United Malays National Organisation politicians
Members of the Dewan Negara
Members of the Dewan Rakyat
Members of the 15th Malaysian Parliament
Year of birth missing (living people)